"Indian Sunset" is a song written by English musician Elton John and songwriter Bernie Taupin, and performed by John. It was released on John's 1971 album Madman Across the Water.

Background

The song chronicles the story of an unnamed American Indian warrior on the verge of defeat from the white man. Taupin was inspired to write the lyrics after visiting a Native American reservation. It contains numerous inaccuracies, most notably the line about Geronimo being shot by U.S soldiers. In reality, the Apache warrior died of pneumonia at the age of 79.

John told Rolling Stone in 2011 that this is one of his favourites to play live: "I do 'Indian Sunset' with Ray Cooper. Nobody knows that song at all, it's an obscure track from Madman Across the Water, and it gets a standing ovation every night. It's a six-minute movie in a song."

Sampling
In 2004, the song was sampled in an Eminem-produced Tupac Shakur song entitled "Ghetto Gospel". It topped the charts in United Kingdom, Australia, Czech Republic, Ireland, and Scotland. It also become a Top Ten and Top 20 hit on some countries.

References

1970s ballads
Rock ballads
Songs with music by Elton John
Songs with lyrics by Bernie Taupin
Indian Sunset
1971 songs
Song recordings produced by Gus Dudgeon
Songs about Native Americans